The Palestinian Heritage Center is a Palestinian cultural center located in Bethlehem. It was established in 1991 by Maha Saca. The center contains several exhibitions on Palestinian costumes, folklore, history, and other cultural aspects.

External links  
Palestinian Heritage Center Homepage

Buildings and structures in Bethlehem
Palestinian culture
Palestinian clothing
Tourist attractions in the State of Palestine
1991 establishments in the Palestinian territories